The National Confederation of Hungarian Trade Unions (MSzOSz) is a national trade union center in Hungary. It was formed in 1990 and has a membership of 465,000 active members and 250,000 pensioners and apprentices.

The MSzOSz is affiliated with the International Trade Union Confederation, and the European Trade Union Confederation.

References

External links
Official site

European Trade Union Confederation
International Trade Union Confederation
National trade union centers of Hungary
Trade Union Advisory Committee to the OECD
Trade unions established in 1990